The West Sumatra Regional People's Representative Council (abbreviated DPRD Sumbar) is the unicameral legislative body within the regional government of the Indonesian province of West Sumatra. The council is composed of 65 members elected via party lists in the 2019 general election.

It convenes in the Gedung DPRD Sumatra Barat, North Padang District, Padang City.

Composition

Speakers

Electoral districts 
For the 2019 Indonesian general election, there were 65 seats for contest from 8 electoral districts:
West Sumatra 1: Padang City (10 seats)
West Sumatra 2: Padang Pariaman Regency and Pariaman City (7 seats)
West Sumatra 3: Agam Regency and Bukittinggi City (8 seats)
West Sumatra 4: Pasaman Regency and West Pasaman Regency (9 seats)
West Sumatra 5: Lima Puluh Kota Regency and Payakumbuh City (6 seats)
West Sumatra 6: Padang Panjang City, Tanah Datar Regency, Sawahlunto City, Sijunjung Regency and Dharmasraya Regency (11 seats)
West Sumatra 7: Solok City, Solok Regency and South Solok Regency (7 seats)
West Sumatra 8: Pesisir Selatan Regency and Mentawai Islands Regency (7 seats)

References

Politics of West Sumatra
Provincial assemblies of Indonesia